"Even If" is the eleventh single released by Japanese singer Ken Hirai. It was released on December 6, 2000 and reached #3 on the Oricon weekly chart, with a total of 360,000 sales. The track "Even if" appears on Hirai's fourth studio album, Gaining Through Losing. It was also included in his first best-of compilation released in 2005.

The song was originally called "Bourbon and Cassis Soda" (バーボンとカシスソーダ).

Track list
Even If
Written and Composed by Ken Hirai.
Green Christmas
Written by Ken Hirai. Composed by Uru.

References

2001 singles
Ken Hirai songs
Songs written by Ken Hirai
Songs about alcohol
Defstar Records singles
2000 songs